Jack Wighton (born 4 February 1993) is an Australian professional rugby league footballer who plays as a  for the Canberra Raiders in the NRL and Australia at international level.

He has played at representative level for the Indigenous All Stars, Country Origin, Prime Minister's XIII, and New South Wales in the State of Origin series.

Background
Wighton was born in Orange, New South Wales, Australia. He is Wiradjuri on his mother's side, his family are from Peak Hill (Bulgandramine Mission) and Wellington, New South Wales. Jack is related to Brent Naden, Willie Tonga and Rabbitohs player Latrell Mitchell (Mitchell's 3 x Great Grandmother Josephine Wighton and Jack Wighton's 3 x Great Grandfather Ernest Wighton are brother and sister).

Wighton played his junior football for Orange CYMS and Bloomfield Tigers before being signed by the Canberra Raiders. He played for the Werribee Centrals Football Club reserves sides.

Wighton left his job as a brickie's labourer to pursue a career in football.

Playing career

Early career
Wighton has represented NSW Under 18s and Australian Schoolboys in 2010.

Wighton played for the Raiders NYC team in 2011 before being promoted to the Raiders full-time NRL squad.

2012
In round 6, against the New Zealand Warriors, Wighton scored his first NRL try in the Raiders 32–12 win at Canberra Stadium. On 30 May 2012, Wighton suffered a toe injury in a freak trampoline accident which resulted in him missing most of the year, until he made a return in the semi-final match against the South Sydney Rabbitohs in the Raiders 38–16 loss at ANZ Stadium. On 22 August 2012, Wighton extended his contract with the Raiders until the end of the 2014 season. Wighton finished his debut year in the NRL with him playing in 9 matches and scoring 2 tries for the Raiders in the 2012 NRL season.

2013
On 9 February 2013, Wighton was selected to play for the Indigenous All Stars off the interchange bench in the 32–6 win over the NRL All Stars team at Suncorp Stadium. Wighton was also selected to play for NSW Country at centre against NSW City in Country's 18–12 win in Coffs Harbour. Wighton finished the 2013 NRL season with him playing in 18 matches and scoring 4 tries for the Raiders. On 1 November 2013 Wighton re-signed with the Raiders until the end of 2016.

2014
Wighton started the season playing at five-eighth by incoming Raider coach Ricky Stuart. On 4 May 2014, Wighton played at centre for NSW Country against NSW City in the 26-26 all draw. In Round 10 against the Penrith Panthers, Wighton returned to his preferred centre position in the Raiders 26–20 loss at Canberra Stadium. Wighton played at centre until Round 24, when he was selected to play at fullback for a clash with the Cronulla-Sutherland Sharks. He had a successful match, helping the Raiders to a 22–12 win at Shark Park. Wighton had a successful end of the season at fullback for the Raiders. Wighton finished the 2014 NRL season having played in 20 matches and scored 6 tries. On 9 September 2014, Wighton was selected in the Australia Kangaroos 2014 Four Nations train-on squad but didn't make the final 24-man squad.

2015
On 13 February 2015, Wighton was selected on the interchange bench for the Indigenous All Stars in the 2015 All Stars match. The Indigenous side won 20–6 over the NRL All Stars at Robina Stadium. 

On 3 May 2015, Wighton played for New South Wales Country against New South Wales City in the 2015 City vs Country Origin match, playing at centre and scoring a try in Country's 34–22 win at Wagga Wagga. In Round 25 against the Penrith Panthers, Wighton was charged with a grade two careless high tackle after he blindsided Panthers halfback Jamie Soward, following a break downfield. The hit left Soward unconscious and he had to be assisted off the field on a stretcher during the Raiders 34–18 win at Canberra Stadium. He was later suspended for a match, missing out in the Raiders last match of the season. Wighton finished the 2015 NRL season having played in 20 matches and scoring 7 tries for the Raiders. On 26 September 2015, Wighton played for the Prime Minister's XIII against Papua New Guinea, scoring a try in the 40–12 win in Port Moresby.

2016
On 13 January 2016, Wighton was named in the emerging New South Wales Blues squad. On 13 February 2016, Wighton played for the Indigenous All Stars against the World All Stars, playing off the interchange bench in the 12–8 loss at Suncorp Stadium. On 8 May 2016, Wighton played for Country Origin against City Origin, where he played at fullback in the 44–30 loss in Tamworth. On 8 September 2016, Wighton was very lucky to escape a 3-week suspension for a shoulder charge in which he did on Wests Tigers player Joel Edwards in Round 26 in the 52-10 thumping win at Leichhardt Oval. The suspension could have ruled out Wighton from all the Raiders 3 finals matches and ended his season early. Wighton finished the 2016 NRL season with him playing 26 matches and scoring 8 tries for the Raiders.

2017
On 10 February 2017, Wighton played for the Indigenous All Stars against the World All Stars in the 2017 All Stars match, starting at fullback in the 34–8 win at Hunter Stadium. In Round 7 against the New Zealand Warriors, Wighton played his 100th NRL career match in the 20–8 win at Canberra Stadium. On 23 May 2017, Wighton extended his contract with the Raiders to the end of the 2020 season. Wighton finished the 2017 NRL season with him playing in 23 matches and scoring 7 tries for the Raiders.

2018

On 28 June 2018, Wighton was stood down by Canberra after admitting in court to assault and urinating in public during a Canberra night out earlier in the year.

On 9 July, Wighton was suspended by Canberra for six matches but elected not to terminate his contract regardless of the outcome of the court case hearing.
On 13 July, The NRL who were unhappy with the suspension Canberra handed down to Wighton, increased his suspension to ten matches, which put him out for the rest of the season, plus a monetary fine of $30,000.

Wighton ultimately avoided jail time.

He finished the 2018 NRL season having playing in 13 matches and scoring 3 tries.

2019
In round 5 of the 2019 NRL season against the Parramatta Eels, Wighton scored a try from a Sam Williams cross field kick in the 61st Minute to seal Canberra's fourth win of the season whilst also solidifying Wighton's position as five-eighth of the side.

On 5 June, Wighton made his State of Origin debut off the bench for New South Wales in game 1 of the 2019 State of Origin series at Suncorp Stadium. In the 56th minute, Wighton was interchanged for Cody Walker at five-eighth, he then went on to throw an intercept pass for Dane Gagai to run the length of the field and score in the 67th minute of the game.  New South Wales would go on to lose the game 18–14.

On 16 June, Wighton was a shock selection at centre replacing Latrell Mitchell for New South Wales for game 2 in Perth. New South Wales went on to win the game 2 38–6.

On 10 July, Wighton was part of the Origin decider for New South Wales at left centre in which New South Wales won 26–20 at ANZ Stadium.

In round 22, Wighton played his 150th NRL game for Canberra in their 18–22 win over the Melbourne Storm at AAMI park.  Wighton made a total of 26 appearances for Canberra as the club reached their first grand final in 25 years.  In the 2019 NRL Grand Final against the Sydney Roosters, Wighton scored a try in the first half.  Canberra would go on to lose the final 14–8 at ANZ Stadium.  Wighton was awarded the Clive Churchill Medal after being voted man of the match, making him the fourth man to achieve this from a losing side, joining Canberra's Bradley Clyde (1991), St George's Brad Mackay (1993) and Manly's Daly Cherry-Evans (2013).

On 7 October, Wighton was named in the Australian side for the upcoming Oceania Cup fixtures.

2020
In round 16 of the 2020 NRL season, Wighton scored two tries in a 34–20 victory over Canterbury-Bankstown at GIO Stadium.

In round 18 against St. George, he scored two tries in a 37–8 victory for Canberra at WIN Stadium.

Wighton was rewarded for a stellar home and away season by being named joint Meninga Medal winner with Josh Papalii, having finished on atop the voting for the club's player of the year award at a subdued in-house ceremony.

Wighton also took home the Dally M Medal as the NRL's player of the year after polling 26 votes to edge out Clint Gutherson and Nathan Cleary. There was controversy around the announcement after the Daily Telegraph published the results hours before the ceremony took place.

Wighton was selected for the 2020 State of Origin series but was played out of position in the centres by New South Wales coach Brad Fittler.  Wighton played in all three games for New South Wales as they suffered a shock 2–1 defeat against Queensland.

2021
In round 10 of the 2021 NRL season, Wighton was sent to the sin bin after using an illegal cannonball tackle on Canterbury player Adam Elliott during the club's 20-18 victory.

On 30 May, Wighton was selected by New South Wales for game one of the 2021 State of Origin series despite his poor form at club level for Canberra.

Wighton played 21 games for Canberra in the 2021 NRL season which saw the club finish a disappointing 10th place on the table.

2022
On 29 May, Wighton was selected by New South Wales to play in game one of the 2022 State of Origin series.

In October, he was named in the Australia squad for the 2021 Rugby League World Cup.

Wighton played for Australia in their 2021 Rugby League World Cup final victory over Samoa.

2023
On 5 February, it was alleged that Wighton who was out celebrating his 30th birthday became involved in a fight with South Sydney player and Australian teammate Latrell Mitchell. Witnesses saw the pair allegedly fight in the Canberra CBD outside a nightclub on Bunda Street at 3:45AM and called police. ACT Police subsequently charged Wighton with fighting in a public place and failing to comply with an exclusion direction. Wighton was ordered to attend ACT Magistrates Court on 22 February 2023 regarding the incident.

Assault charges 
In February 2018, while celebrating his birthday in Canberra, Wighton assaulted five people outside a nightclub and faced a number of charges including assault and public urination.

He initially pleaded not guilty to all charges, but after prosecutors said they were prepared to produce CCTV evidence, changed his mind. In June, Wighton pleaded guilty to six charges in the ACT Magistrates Court, including assault and public urination, while prosecutors dropped several of the other charges.

In July, Wighton was suspended by Raiders for six matches but they confirmed he would keep his job. After viewing the CCTV footage, the NRL extended his suspension until the end of the season, and fined him $30,000.

On 14 November, Wighton avoided jail time and was given a suspended two-month sentence and a $3,500 fine. Magistrate Bernadette Boss noted his positive character references, and existing punishment from the NRL.

Following sentencing, the footage of Wighton in urine-soaked trousers launching unprovoked attacks on five different passers-by was released to the media.

References

External links

Canberra Raiders profile

1993 births
Living people
Australia national rugby league team players
Australian rugby league players
Canberra Raiders players
Clive Churchill Medal winners
Country New South Wales Origin rugby league team players
Indigenous All Stars players
Indigenous Australian rugby league players
Junior Kangaroos players
New South Wales Rugby League State of Origin players
Prime Minister's XIII players
Rugby league centres
Rugby league fullbacks
Rugby league five-eighths
Rugby league players from Orange, New South Wales
Wiradjuri people